Pascal Charbonneau (born May 6, 1983, in Montreal) is a Canadian Grandmaster of chess, and a financial analyst. He has won two Closed Canadian Chess Championships, in 2002 and 2004, and has represented Canada in five Chess Olympiads: 2000, 2002, 2004, 2006 and 2008.

Early years 

Pascal Charbonneau was introduced to chess through the Chess'n Math Association scholastic programs in Montreal, while he was in grade one. He showed talent and, coached by FM Richard Bérubé, he won a clutch of provincial and national grade school championships over the next several years.

Reaching National Master strength by age 14, he shared 2nd-3rd places in the Canadian Cadet Championship (under 16) at Victoria 1997 with 6.5/9. A few months later, he made a big step forward when he placed 2nd in the 1997–98 Junior Canadian Chess Championship in Winnipeg with 9/11. In 1998, he won the Canadian Cadet (Under 16) Championship in Saskatoon with 7/9. Then he won the 1998–99 Junior Canadian Championship in Vancouver with 10/11. This qualified him into the 1999 World Junior Championship at Yerevan, where he scored 6/13. Charbonneau won the 1999 Canadian Youth Championship (U16 group) at Vancouver with 4.5/5. He tied for 1st-2nd places, with Danny Goldenberg, in the 1999–2000 Canadian Junior Championship in Montreal, but lost the playoff match. He won the 2000 CYCC, Boys' Under 18 group, in Calgary with 5.5/6. He won the knockout-style provincial Quebec Championship in 2000.

He defeated Grandmaster Igor Miladinović by 3.5-2.5 in a 2000 exhibition match in Montreal. He followed this up by winning the 2000–01 Canadian Junior Championship in Montreal with 6.5/8. He then won the 2001 CYCC at Sackville with a perfect score, 7/7. A below-standard result was only shared 4th-6th place in the 2001–02 Canadian Junior Championship at Winnipeg with 5/8.

Canadian Olympian 

Charbonneau earned his first Canadian national team selection at the age of 17 in 2000, and has gone on to play for Canada in the next three Chess Olympiads as well. He earned his FIDE Master (FM) title from his performance at Istanbul 2000, as well as from the Montreal International a few months earlier. A summary of his Olympiad results follows (from olimpbase.org). His aggregate to date is (+14 =12 -17), with his most memorable moment coming from a victory over the world's top-rated player, Viswanathan Anand, at Turin.

 Istanbul 2000: board 4, 4.5/9 (+2 =5 -2)
 Bled 2002: board 3, 6/11 (+5 =2 -4)
 Calvià 2004: board 1, 5/12 (+3 =4 -5)
 Turin 2006: board 1, 4.5/11 (+4 =1 -6).

Chess scholarship 

Charbonneau earned a chess scholarship to the University of Maryland, Baltimore County, beginning in 2001, and represented that school in the Pan American Intercollegiate Team Chess Championship. He got to work on his chess with GM Alexander Onischuk. In the fall of 2005 he played Board 1 on the winning Baltimore Kingfishers team in the online United States Chess League and won the MVP title. He studied Mathematics and Finance, and graduated in 2006, taking a job on Wall Street.

Canadian Champion 

Charbonneau won the 2002 Closed / Zonal Canadian Chess Championship at Richmond, British Columbia. He tied 1st-2nd places with Kevin Spraggett with 8.5/11, then won the two-game playoff match 1.5–0.5. Charbonneau earned the International Master title for his victory. He continued his excellent play by sharing 1st-3rd places in the 2002 Open Canadian Chess Championship in Montreal with 8/10, along with Jean-Marc Degraeve and Jean Hébert.

Charbonneau made his first Grandmaster norm at the Montreal International 2003, where he scored 6.5/11 for 5th place with 9 GMs in the field. Shortly afterwards, he scored his second GM norm in the Americas Continental Championship at Buenos Aires 2003, with 8/11, which was good for a shared 3rd-8th place. He lost his World Championship first-round knockout match to Alexey Dreev at Tripoli 2005 2–0.

Grandmaster 

Charbonneau won his second Closed / Zonal Canadian Chess Championship at Toronto 2004, again in a playoff. He tied with Eric Lawson on 7/9, then won the two-game playoff match 2–0. Charbonneau was mugged at gunpoint at the 2005 World Open in Philadelphia. He scored his final GM norm by winning the 2006 Chicago Winter Invitational with 6/9. In the Closed / Zonal Canadian Chess Championship at Toronto 2006, Charbonneau shared 2nd-5th places with 6.5/9, behind new champion Igor Zugic. The story of his becoming a Grandmaster is in the book King's Gambit: A Son, A Father and the World's Most Dangerous Game by Paul Hoffman, 2007.

Charbonneau's younger sister, Anne-Marie Charbonneau, won the 2002–2003 Canadian Junior Girls' Championship, is a Candidate Master level player, and was a member of the winning team from the University of Montreal at the 2006 Canadian Post-Secondary Championships in Montreal.

Notable chess games 
Igor Miladinovic vs Pascal Charbonneau, Montreal match 2000, game 4, Queen's Indian Defence (A47) 0-1 As an untitled player facing a Grandmaster, Charbonneau scores an upset win.
Pascal Charbonneau vs Viorel  Iordachescu, Bled Olympiad 2002, Modern Defence (B06), 1-0
Pascal Charbonneau vs Gilberto Milos, Americas Continental Championship, Buenos Aires 2003, Caro-Kann Defence, Advance Variation (B12), 1-0 The strong Brazilian GM loses in a major upset as Charbonneau scores his second GM norm.
Pascal Charbonneau vs Alexander Huzman, Montreal International 2005, Sicilian Defence, Najdorf Variation (B96), 1-0 Very nice positional victory over the experienced Israeli GM.
Eugene Perelshteyn vs Pascal Charbonneau, Chicago Winter Invitational 2006, Sicilian Defence, Dragon Variation, Yugoslav Attack (B78), 0-1 A key win from the event where Charbonneau became a Grandmaster.
Pascal Charbonneau vs Viswanathan Anand, Turin Olympiad 2006, Sicilian Defence, Paulsen Variation (B44), 1-0 Anand attacks and Charbonneau defends precisely.

Results Timeline for Chess World Cup

External links 
 
 
 
 
 

1983 births
Living people
Canadian chess players
Chess grandmasters
Chess Olympiad competitors
Sportspeople from Montreal
University of Maryland, Baltimore County alumni